Miriama Kadavu Tuisorisori-Chambault (born 27 March 1952) is a Fijian sprinter. She competed in the women's 100 metres at the 1984 Summer Olympics. She was the first woman to represent Fiji at the Olympics.

References

External links

1952 births
Living people
Athletes (track and field) at the 1974 British Commonwealth Games
Commonwealth Games competitors for Fiji
Athletes (track and field) at the 1976 Summer Olympics
Athletes (track and field) at the 1984 Summer Olympics
Fijian female sprinters
Fijian female long jumpers
Fijian pentathletes
Olympic athletes of Fiji
Place of birth missing (living people)